Michael Brown (born April 1971) is a former professional tennis player from Australia. He played Davis Cup tennis for Hong Kong.

Biography
Brown, who comes from Wollongong, was the 1987 Australian School Boys champion. He made the boys' singles quarter-finals at the 1989 Australian Open and turned professional later that year.

Coached by Terry Rocavert, he made the men's singles main draw of the 1990 Australian Open after making it through qualifying and was beaten in the first round by Karel Nováček, over four sets. As a doubles player he was most successful in his partnership with Andrew Kratzmann, with whom he made the main draw twice at the Sydney Indoor, including a second round appearance in 1990. The pair also competed together as wildcards in the men's doubles at the 1991 Australian Open. He won two Challenger doubles titles, one with Kratzmann in Hobart in 1991 and the other partnering Roger Rasheed in Antwerp in 1992.

While living in Hong Kong he was called up to play for their Davis Cup team and appeared in a total of six ties from 2001 to 2004.

Challenger titles

Doubles: (2)

References

External links
 
 
 

1971 births
Living people
Australian male tennis players
Hong Kong male tennis players
Sportspeople from Wollongong
Tennis people from New South Wales
Australian expatriate sportspeople in Hong Kong